Violet Nelson is a Kwakwakaʼwakw and Honduran actress from Canada. She is most noted for her performance as Rosie in the film The Body Remembers When the World Broke Open, for which she received a Vancouver Film Critics Circle nomination for Best Actress in a Canadian Film at the Vancouver Film Critics Circle Awards 2019, and a Canadian Screen Award nomination for Best Lead Actress at the 8th Canadian Screen Awards in 2020.

References

External links

Canadian film actresses
Actresses from British Columbia
First Nations actresses
Kwakwaka'wakw people
Canadian people of Honduran descent
Living people
Year of birth missing (living people)
21st-century First Nations people